Summer's End is a 1999 drama television film directed by Helen Shaver (in her directorial debut) from a screenplay by Grant Scharbo and Jim Thompson, based on a story by Scharbo. The film tells the story of two teenage brothers who have lost their father, one of which befriends an African-American physician facing racial prejudice in a small town in Georgia.

The film premiered on Showtime on January 30, 1999. It received nominations for four Daytime Emmy Awards, and won for best children's special and also best actor (James Earl Jones).

Plot
A young boy (Jake LeDoux), still grieving over his father's death, befriends a retired physician (James Earl Jones), the former chief of cardiology at an Atlanta hospital who has returned to his hometown in North Georgia where he had a traumatic boyhood; but racial intolerance in the local, predominantly white, lakeside community ends up souring the relationship.

Cast 
 James Earl Jones as Dr. William 'Bill' Blakely
 Jake LeDoux as Jamie Baldwin
 Brendan Fletcher as Hunter Baldwin
 Wendy Crewson as Virginia Baldwin
 Jonathan Kroeker as Lad Trapnell
 Al Waxman as Grandpa Trapnell
 Andrew Sardella as Alex Rifkin
 R.D. Reid as Henry Whitley
 Gary Reineke as Sheriff Miller
 Patrick McManus as Inspector
 Randy Hughson as Rainey
 Sarah Francis as Erinn
 Victor Garber as narrator

References

External links
 

1999 directorial debut films
1999 drama films
1999 television films
1999 films
Canadian drama films
American drama television films
English-language Canadian films
Films about brothers
Films about racism
Films set in Georgia (U.S. state)
Films shot in Ontario
Showtime (TV network) films
Television series by Temple Street Productions
1990s American films
1990s Canadian films